Ryan Duffey Strode (born May 25, 1977) is an American former street preacher who, as a 10-year-old child, became the subject of nationwide controversy in the 1980s for his idiosyncratic style of preaching. Strode's sermons were characterized by bellowing rote-learned excerpts from the Bible; in particular those pertaining to Hell and sin.

Overview
Duffey Strode and his family made national news in 1988 when then-10-year-old Duffey, his 6-year-old sister, Pepper, and their 5-year-old brother, Matthew, began preaching outside their Marion, North Carolina elementary school. The children's idiosyncratic style of preaching consisted of shouting biblical passages concerning Christian views of Hell and sin at their classmates. Oprah Winfrey, Larry King, and at least 15 other television talk-show hosts sought interviews with the preaching children who had become a source of controversy in their mountain town.

After six months of media attention and many school suspensions, Duffey Strode's parents, David and Robin Strode, agreed to keep their children away from the school and educate the three themselves.

As an adolescent, Duffey began dating Kim Ellington, a girl who attended New Manna Baptist Church, the Marion, North Carolina megachurch that had previously thrown the Strode family out. He left home in June 1997 to live with a punk rocker friend and the Strode family would not speak to him for 10 months. In November 1997, Duffey and Ellington, then aged 20 and 19 years, respectively, were married at the Marion Community Center, where the Strode family had once faced hundreds of angry townspeople at a filming of The Sally Jessy Raphael Show. David, Robin, Pepper, and Matthew Strode did not attend the wedding.

References

External links

American Christians
Living people
People from Marion, North Carolina
1977 births